The near-horizon metric (NHM) refers to the near-horizon limit of the global metric of a black hole. NHMs play an important role in studying the geometry and topology of black holes, but are only well defined for extremal black holes. NHMs are expressed in Gaussian null coordinates, and one important property is that the dependence on the coordinate  is fixed in the near-horizon limit.

NHM of extremal Reissner–Nordström black holes

The metric of extremal Reissner–Nordström black hole  is

Taking the near-horizon limit

and then omitting the tildes, one obtains the near-horizon metric

NHM of extremal Kerr black holes 

The metric of extremal Kerr black hole in Boyer–Lindquist coordinates can be written in the following two enlightening forms,

where

Taking the  near-horizon limit

and omitting the tildes, one obtains the near-horizon metric (this is also called extremal Kerr throat )

NHM of extremal Kerr–Newman black holes 

Extremal Kerr–Newman black holes are described by the metric

where

Taking the near-horizon transformation

and omitting the tildes, one obtains the NHM

NHMs of generic black holes

In addition to the NHMs of extremal Kerr–Newman family metrics discussed above, all stationary NHMs could be written in the form

See also

Extremal black hole
Reissner–Nordström metric
Kerr metric
Kerr–Newman metric

References

General relativity
Black holes